"Relight My Fire" is a popular disco song written and released by American musician, singer, songwriter, and record producer Dan Hartman as the title track from his 1979 album of the same name. It was also performed by Costa Anadiotis' band Café Society in 1984 and British boy band Take That (with Lulu in a featured role) in 1993, five months before Hartman died.

Dan Hartman original version
Originally released in 1979 as the follow-up to "Instant Replay", "Relight My Fire" topped the United States dance charts for six weeks from December 12, 1979, to February 16, 1980; it was less successful in the UK, however, where it failed to chart. Loleatta Holloway is credited as a featured vocalist on some versions of the record, singing the "strong enough to walk on through the night" refrain. The song's strings and horns were played by MFSB and conducted by longtime MFSB member Don Renaldo. The 12" version includes a 4½-minute intro called "Vertigo", often used in discos as a floor-filler before the song begins; this 11:22 version is available on Hartman's 1994 hits package titled Keep the Fire Burnin'. The title track from this album was a new recording between Hartman and Holloway, featuring some samples from "Relight My Fire".

Versions
7" vinyl single version, 3:42, US release: Blue Sky, CBS ZS9 2784, 1979
12" vinyl The Historical 1979 Re-Mix, 6:52, UK release: Blue Sky, SKY 12 8104, 1979
 Vertigo/Relight My Fire, album version, 9:44, US release: Blue Sky, JZ 36302, 1979
12" vinyl  Vertigo/Relight My Fire (Progressive Instrumental Remix), 11:22, US release: Blue Sky, 4Z8-2790, 1979
 Vertigo/Relight My Fire (Full-length version), 11:55, mixed By John Luongo, edited by Ben Liebrand (appears on CD compilation Grand 12 inches volume 2, Sony Music Media 5198852000, 2005). This version features the full "Vertigo" intro of the "progressive instrumental mix", the entire 4-bar break and full vocal part of the album version and ends with the full outro of the "progressive instrumental mix".

In the media
This song is featured in Grand Theft Auto: The Ballad of Gay Tony on the in-game radio station K109 The Studio, as well as during the end credits of the game.
This song was the theme of the 1980's classic Mexican sitcom called Mis Huéspedes (My Guests in English).
From January 2 – December 17, 1981, the instrumental of this song was adapted as the theme for Tom Snyder's The Tomorrow Show after it was renamed Tomorrow Coast to Coast.
A remix of the song by X-Treme, re-titled "My Fire", appears in Dance Dance Revolution.
"Relight My Fire" was featured in the 2021 television miniseries Halston.

Charts

Weekly charts

Year-end charts

Take That version

English boy band Take That covered "Relight My Fire" in 1993 with guest vocals from Scottish singer Lulu, reprising the Holloway role. It was released in September 1993 as the third single from their second album, Everything Changes (1993). The second of the band's 12 number-one hits, it topped the UK Singles Chart for two weeks in October same year. It was the first UK number-one single for Lulu and at the time broke the record between an act's chart debut and their reaching number one on the UK Singles Chart, happening 29 years 148 days after her debut with "Shout" in 1964.

The band performed Dan Hartman's "Vertigo/Relight My Fire" version as the intro and opening number of their Nobody Else Tour (featuring British singer Juliet Roberts in the female vocal role).

In 1999, Love to Infinity remixed Take That's cover and issued it on a 12-inch single pressing "3.0 Hitmixes". In 2005, the track was remixed for their reunion compilation, known as the 'Element Remix'. However, only a three-track CD single featuring the new remix was issued to DJs while the commercial CD single pressing was withdrawn.

The band appeared on Mooi! Weer de Leeuw in the Netherlands on March 14, 2009, to perform "The Garden". They also ended up performing "Back For Good" and "Relight My Fire" due to popular demand from the host and audience the next day.

Critical reception
AllMusic editor Peter Fawthrop described "Relight My Fire" as a "saucy dance track". Another editor, Dave Thompson, felt the Lulu collaboration "is a riot". Tom Ewing of Freaky Trigger stated that it was "a confident consolidation of their stardom", and called it a "fine" and "very enjoyable" song. He also added that Lulu "had the lungs for the job – she needed to, replacing a Loleatta Holloway vocal." In his weekly UK chart commentary, James Masterton wrote, "A hit almost before it started". Alan Jones from Music Week gave it five out of five and named it Pick of the Week, declaring it as a "storming version" and "faithful to the original", with the guest vocalist turning in "an excellent performance". He concluded with that "this is certain to follow "Pray" all the way to number one." In an retrospective review, Pop Rescue constated that the strings, piano, disco beat and tempo "are all wonderful", noting that Lulu "makes light work of the vocals and really shows off her powerful vocal range – a raw contrast against Gary's softer voice." Mike Soutar from Smash Hits gave "Relight My Fire" four out of five, remarking that it "sounds so authentically '70s" He also felt that "she fits in. A stroke of genius."

Chart performance
"Relight My Fire" was successful on the charts on several continents, peaking at number-one in both Israel and the UK. In the latter, it went straight to the top position on the UK Singles Chart, on October 3, 1993. It was Take That's second number-one hit on the chart and spent two weeks at the top. Additionally, it was a top 10 hit also in Belgium (10), Finland (5), Ireland (2), Lithuania and the Netherlands (10), as well as on the Eurochart Hot 100, where it hit number eight in August 1993. "Relight My Fire" was also a top 20 hit in Denmark (19), Germany (18) and Switzerland (18), a top 30 hit in Austria (27) and Iceland (24). Outside Europe, it was also a top 40 hit in Australia and Japan. 

"Relight My Fire" earned a silver record in the UK, with a sale of 360,000 singles.

Music video
A music video was produced to promote the single, which was filmed on August 31, 1993. It depicts the band and singer Lulu dancing and partying in a club atmosphere.

Track listings
"Motown Medley" contains versions of "Just My Imagination", "My Girl", "Reach Out (I'll Be There)", "Get Ready", "Treat Her Like a Lady" and "I Got You (I Feel Good)".

 UK and Japanese CD1 (74321167722; BVCZ 1017)
 "Relight My Fire" (radio version) – 3:59
 "Relight My Fire" (full length version) – 11:17
 "Relight My Fire" (Late Night mix) – 6:47
 "Relight My Fire" (All Night mix) – 6:58
 "Relight My Fire" (Night Beats) – 5:20

 UK and Japanese CD2 (74321 16861 2; BVCZ 1018)
 "Relight My Fire" (radio version) – 4:11
 "Why Can't I Wake Up with You?" (live version) – 5:13
 "Motown Medley" (live version) – 10:14
 "Take That and Party" (live version) – 2:49

 UK 7-inch and cassette single (74321167727; 74321167724)
 "Relight My Fire" (radio version) – 3:59
 "Why Can't I Wake Up with You?" (live version) – 5:13

 European CD single (74321 17033 2)
 "Relight My Fire" (radio version) – 3:59
 "Why Can't I Wake Up with You?" (live version) – 5:13
 "Relight My Fire" (Late Night mix) – 6:47

 Australian CD single (74321168612)
 "Relight My Fire" (radio version) – 3:59
 "Relight My Fire" (full length version) – 11:17
 "Relight My Fire" (Late Night mix) – 6:47
 "Why Can't I Wake Up with You?" (live version) – 5:13
 "Take That and Party" (live) – 2:49

 UK withdrawn CD single (2005) (82876760602)
 "Relight My Fire" (Element remix) – 3:46
 "Relight My Fire" (original version) – 4:11
 "Relight My Fire" (Element remix video) – 4:12

 UK withdrawn 12-inch single (2005) (82876760601)
A1. "Relight My Fire" (Element remix) – 3:46
B1. "Relight My Fire" (Joey Negro club mix) – 6:43
B2. "Relight My Fire" (Joey Negro vocal mix) – 7:05

Personnel
 Gary Barlow – lead vocals
 Howard Donald – backing vocals
 Jason Orange – backing vocals
 Mark Owen – backing vocals
 Robbie Williams – backing vocals
 Lulu – guest vocals, backing vocals

Charts

Weekly charts

Year-end charts

Certifications and sales

|}

Ricky Martin version

Ricky Martin covered "Relight My Fire" in 2003. In late January 2003, Billboard reported that Grammy Award-winning remixer Hex Hector recently spent time in the studio with Martin and Anastacia. The trio, with Hector in the producer's seat, completed a cover of Dan Hartman's disco classic "Relight My Fire." Billboard added that Anastacia reprised Loleatta Holloway's performance from the original, and the song should appear on Martin's forthcoming album. However, the single released in February 2003 included Holloway's original vocals, and the song did not appear on any of Martin's albums. "Relight My Fire" is credited to "Martin featuring Loleatta Holloway."

Chart performance
On the Billboard issue dated April 19, 2003, "Relight My Fire" appeared on the Hot Dance Breakouts chart, and on May 3, 2003, it entered the Dance Club Songs at number thirty-eight. The song peaked at number five on June 21, 2003, and spent twelve weeks on the Dance Club Songs chart.

Charts

References

1979 singles
1979 songs
1993 singles
Dan Hartman songs
Take That songs
Lulu (singer) songs
Loleatta Holloway songs
Disco songs
UK Singles Chart number-one singles
Number-one singles in Israel
Song recordings produced by Dan Hartman
Songs written by Dan Hartman